The Welfare Centre Ground is a cricket ground in Rose Hall, Guyana.

History
The inaugural first-class cricket match to be played at the ground took place in March 1961, when Berbice played against a touring EW Swanton's XI. British Guiana played Trinidad there in a first-class match in October of the same year. Berbice played first-class matches there until the final of the 1976/77 Jones Cup against Demerara. Between the 1973/74 Shell Shield and the 1985/86 Shell Shield, Guyana played five first-class matches at the ground.

Records

First-class
 Highest team total: 504 by Guyana v Combined Leeward and Windward Islands, 1978/79
 Lowest team total: 128 by Berice v Demerara, 1972/73
 Highest individual innings: 200* by Timur Mohamed for Guyana v Windward Islands, 1985/86
 Best bowling in an innings: 6-57 by Clyde Butts for Guyana v Windward Islands, 1985/86
 Best bowling in a match: 10-129 by Lance Gibbs for Demerara v Berbice, 1972/73

See also
List of cricket grounds in Guyana

References

External links
Welfare Centre Ground at CricketArchive 

Cricket grounds in Guyana
Sports venues in Guyana